The Darlington Fiddlers were a minor league baseball team based in Darlington, South Carolina in 1906 and 1907. Darlington played as a member of the Class D level South Carolina League.

History
In 1906, Darlington, South Carolina began minor league play, as the city gained a charter franchise in the six–team South Carolina League. The South Carolina League formed for the 1906 season as a Class D level minor league. The Camden, Georgetown, Manning, Orangeburg Cotton Pickers and Sumter Gamecocks teams joined Darlington as South Carolina League charter members. The final 1906 South Carolina League records, rosters and standings are unknown.

In 1907, the Darlington Fiddlers relocated during their second season of play. Darlington continued play in the South Carolina League, beginning league play on May 20, 1907. The league added the Anderson Electricians, Greenville Mountaineers and Spartanburg Spartans as new franchises. On July 27, 1907, Darlington with an 18–38 record moved to Florence, South Carolina and finished the season as the Florence Fiddlers. Playing under managers Frank Moffett and Crese Heismann, the team compiled a 5–7 record based in Florence to finish with an overall record of 23–45. The Anderson and Greenville franchises both folded and the league completed the 1907 season with four teams. The Sumter Game Cocks won the league championship with a 44–23 record. Sumner finished ahead of the Orangeburg Cotton Pickers (42–25), Spartanburg Spartans (36–24) and Darlington/Florence Fiddlers (23–45) in the final standings. The league held no playoffs. 

Darlington folded from the South Carolina League following the 1907 season, as the league played its final 1908 season as a four-team league. Darlington, South Carolina has not hosted another minor league team.

The ballpark
The name of the Darlington Fiddlers' minor league home ballpark is not referenced.

Timeline

Year–by–year records

Notable alumni

Jim Baskette (1907)
Charlie DeArmond (1907)
Roy Evans (1907)
Bob Fisher (1907)
Crese Heismann (1907, MGR)

See also
 Darlington/Florence Fiddlers players

References

External links
Darlington - Baseball Reference

Baseball teams established in 1906
Baseball teams disestablished in 1907
Defunct baseball teams in South Carolina
South Carolina League teams
Darlington, South Carolina